Chen Xianhui (born March 8, 1963) is a Chinese physicist. He is a Changjiang professor of physics of the University of Science and Technology of China (USTC). He was elected an academician of the Chinese Academy of Sciences (CAS) in 2016 and is known for his breakthroughs on iron-based superconductors. He won the State Natural Science Award (First Class) with Zhao Zhongxian and others in 2013 and the Bernd T. Matthias Prize for Superconducting Materials in 2015. His research is mainly on experimental condensed matter physics and materials science.

Recognition

References 

1963 births
Living people
Educators from Hunan
Members of the Chinese Academy of Sciences
People from Xiangtan
Physicists from Hunan
Academic staff of the University of Science and Technology of China